The Sedili Besar River is a river in Kota Tinggi District, Johor, Malaysia.

Name
The word besar means large. At the southern end of Teluk Mahkota bay is a smaller river known as Sungai Sedili Kechil.  The word kechil means small in Malay language.

Geology
The river mouth is situated at the northern end of Teluk Mahkota bay, and empties into the South China Sea. The river has a total drainage basin area of 271 km2.

Bridges
 Haji Mohd Lazim Bridge

See also
 Geography of Malaysia

References

Kota Tinggi District
Rivers of Johor